Agrostis magellanica is a species of grass.  It has a circumpolar distribution and is native to many subantarctic islands in, and the coasts bordering, the Southern Ocean.

Description
Agrostis magellanica is a tufted perennial grass, varying in height from 50 to 450 mm and forming short grassland communities. The culms have purple nodes.  The leaves are wiry.  The panicles are 20–120 mm long, with many shiny, greenish-purple, distinctly awned spikelets.

Distribution and habitat
The grass is found in the south-west of New Zealand’s South Island and on the Antipodes, Auckland, and Campbell Islands. It is also native to Macquarie Island and the Falkland, Kerguelen, Crozet and Prince Edward Islands, as well as southern South America in Tierra del Fuego.  In New Zealand it occupies subalpine and alpine habitats on stony or rocky ground.  In the subantarctic islands it grows at lower altitudes in peat and among mosses and cushion plants, or as scattered small plants in fellfield.

References

Notes

Sources
 
 

magellanica
Flora of the subantarctic islands
Flora of the Antipodes Islands
Flora of the Auckland Islands
Flora of the Campbell Islands
Plants described in 1791